The International Organization of Motor Vehicle Manufacturers (OICA), founded 1919 in Paris, is an international trade association whose members are 39 national automotive industry trade associations. OICA facilitates communication among its member national automotive industry trade associations and advocates for policies and position of mutual interest to its members at the international level and to the general public.

UNECE
OICA hosts on its web site the working documents from various United Nations expert groups, including World Forum for Harmonization of Vehicle Regulations.

Climate change
OICA recognizes anthropogenic climate change as "probably the greatest challenge facing society in the twenty-first century." OICA identifies motor vehicles as a significant factor, contributing about 16% of global man-made carbon dioxide emissions. OICA advocates for an integrated, global approach to global warming.

Auto shows
The OICA coordinates scheduling for the following major auto shows. Bold denotes one of the "big five" , most prestigious shows.

Note that only the passenger car segment is included in this list, while other exhibitions exist for heavy commercial vehicles:

See also
List of auto shows and motor shows by continent
List of automobile manufacturers
World Forum for Harmonization of Vehicle Regulations  of the United Nations Economic Commission for Europe (UNECE)
List of countries by motor vehicle production in the 2010s
List of manufacturers by motor vehicle production

References

External links

International transport organizations
Motor trade associations
Organizations established in 1919
1919 establishments in France